Santiago Eloy Campos (December 25, 1926 – January 20, 2001) was a United States district judge of the United States District Court for the District of New Mexico.

Education and career

Born in Santa Rosa, New Mexico, Campos received a Juris Doctor from the University of New Mexico School of Law in 1953. He was a seaman in the United States Navy during World War II, from 1944 to 1946. He was an assistant and first assistant state attorney general of New Mexico from 1955 to 1957. He was in private practice in Santa Fe, New Mexico from 1957 to 1970, becoming a District judge of New Mexico's First Judicial District from 1971 to 1978.

Federal judicial service

On June 2, 1978, Campos was nominated by President Jimmy Carter to a seat on the United States District Court for the District of New Mexico vacated by Judge Harry Vearle Payne. Campos was confirmed by the United States Senate on July 10, 1978, and received his commission on July 12, 1978. He served as Chief Judge from 1987 to 1989, assuming senior status on December 26, 1992, and serving in that capacity until his death of cancer, in Santa Fe. The Santiago E. Campos United States Courthouse was renamed in his honor in 2004.

See also
List of Hispanic/Latino American jurists
List of first minority male lawyers and judges in New Mexico

References

Sources
 

1926 births
2001 deaths
University of New Mexico alumni
Hispanic and Latino American judges
Judges of the United States District Court for the District of New Mexico
United States district court judges appointed by Jimmy Carter
20th-century American judges
United States Navy sailors
New Mexico state court judges
People from Santa Rosa, New Mexico